Illuminations is a 2001 single digital versatile disc (DVD) by the Canadian rock band The Tea Party. The music DVD spans the years from 1993 to 2000 and includes all of the band's EMI Music Canada produced music videos, remixed by Nick Blagona and Jeff Martin in 5.1 Dolby Digital Surround and DTS sound plus audio commentary, discography, band biography, photos, audio-only track and a behind-the-scenes featurette. The DVD was released in Canada on February 27, 2001.

Track listing 
"The River"
"Save Me"
"A Certain Slant of Light"
"Fire in the Head"
"The Bazaar"
"Shadows on the Mountainside"
"Sister Awake"
"Temptation"
"Babylon"
"Release"
"Psychopomp"
"Heaven Coming down"
 "The Messenger"
"Walking Wounded"

Credits

Chart positions

Cover art
DVD package design by Antoine Moonen

Notes 
Audio: English Dolby Digital 2.0 (192kbit/s), English Dolby Digital 5.1 (448kbit/s), English DTS 5.1 (1536kbit/s), English Audio Commentary Dolby Digital 2.0 (192kbit/s)
Subtitles:	English Song Lyrics
Catalogue: (Canada) EMI 7 2434 92520 9 7.

The Tea Party video albums
2001 live albums
2001 video albums
Live video albums